Dichotomicrobium is a genus of bacteria from the family of Hyphomicrobiaceae. Currently there is only one species of this genus known (Dichotomicrobium thermohalophilum)

References

Hyphomicrobiales
Monotypic bacteria genera
Bacteria genera